Geotrechus is a genus of beetles in the family Carabidae, containing the following species:

 Geotrechus aldensis Jeannel, 1955
 Geotrechus andreae Jeannel, 1920
 Geotrechus debilis Caiffait, 1958
 Geotrechus dequaei Dupre, 1988
 Geotrechus discontignyi Fairmaire, 1867
 Geotrechus dumonti Espanol, 1977
 Geotrechus gallicus Delarouzee, 1857
 Geotrechus holcartensis Genest, 1977
 Geotrechus jeanneli A. Gaudin, 1938
 Geotrechus orcinus Linder, 1859
 Geotrechus orpheus Dieck, 1869
 Geotrechus palei Foures, 1962
 Geotrechus picanyoli Espanol & Escala, 1983
 Geotrechus puigmalensis Lagar Mascaro, 1981
 Geotrechus saulcyi Argad-Vallan, 1913
 Geotrechus seijasi Espanol, 1969
 Geotrechus serrulatus Jeannel, 1946
 Geotrechus soussieuxi Perreau & Queinnec, 1987
 Geotrechus sulcatus Coiffait, 1959
 Geotrechus trophonius Abeille de Perrin, 1872
 Geotrechus ubachi Espanol, 1965
 Geotrechus vandeli Coiffait, 1959
 Geotrechus vanderberghi Perreau & Quinnec, 1987
 Geotrechus vulcanus Abeille de Perrin, 1904

References

Trechinae